Second-seeded Esna Boyd and Jack Hawkes defeated the first seeds Daphne Akhurst and Jim Willard 6–2, 6–4 in the final, to win the mixed doubles tennis title at the 1926 Australasian Championships.

With this win Hawkes completed a Triple Crown achievement, having already won his singles and doubles titles.

Seeds

  Daphne Akhurst /  Jim Willard (final)
  Esna Boyd /  Jack Hawkes (champions)
  Meryl O'Hara Wood /  Pat O'Hara Wood (semifinals)
  Sylvia Harper /  Gar Hone (semifinals)
  Marjorie Cox /  Rupert Wertheim (quarterfinals)
  Kathleen Le Messurier /  Bob Schlesinger (quarterfinals)
 n/a 
  Dorothy Weston /  Ernest Rowe (first round)

Draw

Finals

Earlier rounds

Section 1

Section 2

Notes

 Originally the 7th seeds were Vera Mathias and Norman Peach, but the latter apparently withdrew from the event.
 Most likely. Often spelled Miss C. Finlayson, even in sources that mentioned her as Miss M. Finlayson in other articles.
 List of entrants pairs Mrs. Mathias with Ken Berriman.
 Probably (see:  and ). No source gives an information about such a draw, let alone the result.

References

External links
 Source for seedings

1926 in Australian tennis